Julien Van Roosbroeck (9 October 1935 – 9 April 2021) was a Belgian footballer. He played in one match for the Belgium national football team in 1964.

References

External links
 

1935 births
2021 deaths
Belgian footballers
Belgium international footballers
Place of birth missing
Association football forwards